The Morris Commercial CS8, also known as the "Morris 15 cwt" was a British light military truck of the Second World War.

Introduced in 1934 it was the most numerous vehicle of that size in the British Army at the start of the war but was replaced by other vehicles.

Development

In 1933 the War Office issued a specification for a new type of purpose-built light trucks able to carry  loads, the specification stipulated a short wheelbase, good ground clearance, a semi-forward driver's position and the use of commercial components as much as possible but with the usual cabin eliminated to simplify production. It was planned to issue one 15-cwt truck to every platoon in a re-equipped mechanised British Army to carry personnel and equipment. Morris, Ford, Commer, Guy and Bedford all tendered vehicles to meet the requirement and in 1934 Morris was the first to produce a design, the CS8, which used elements of Morris' civilian C range. The S denoted a 6-cylinder engine and 8 referred to the nominal wheelbase in feet.

Design and performance
The CS8 was a two-wheel drive two axle (4x2) light truck designed to carry  loads. The CS8 was powered by a  6-cylinder inline sidevalve petrol engine  that delivered  at 2,800 rpm and driven through a four-speed transmission; its suspension was by live axles on multi-leaf semi-elliptical springs. Early models featured open cabs with aero screens (small sections of glass to deflect the wind from the driver), folding canvas canopies and roll-up canvas doors, these were later replaced with full windscreens and metal-skinned half doors.

The CS8 was produced with a number of bodies, the majority were the 'General Service' cargo variant but there were also water bowser, fire tender, wireless truck, fuel tanker, compressor truck and command post ("Office") truck bodies. Additionally there was also a variant that carried the 2-pounder (40mm) anti-tank gun 'portee' on the rear body.

Some of the bodies were too long and heavy for the standard wheelbase which caused severe handling problems, particularly the wireless truck.

There was also a variant rated to carry  loads, called the PU8, which shared the same engine and drive line but had improved performance, a four-wheel drive (4x4) version of the PU8 was also produced called the PU8/4.

Service history
In the years leading up to the Second World War the CS8 was the most numerous 15-cwt truck in British service, it was used by all branches of the British military and supplied to Commonwealth countries. A large number of CS8s were left in France after the Dunkirk evacuation and captured by the Germans, in Wehrmacht service they were sometimes fitted with new bodywork,the same happened in North Africa with the Regio Esercito capturing a few and mounting on them the 65/17 cannon.

Early in the war the Army decided it no longer needed 8-cwt trucks and production of the PU8 also ceased in 1941.

A stretched CS8 chassis was the basis of the Morris CS9 armoured car.

Variants 

 Mark I
 Mark II
 Mark III

Notes

References

Further reading

External links

 
 
 

Military trucks of the United Kingdom
World War II vehicles of the United Kingdom
Soft-skinned vehicles
Morris Commercial vehicles